The Beachcomber 25 is an American trailerable sailboat that was designed by Walter Scott as a cruiser and first built in 1979.

Production
The design was built by Marine Innovators in the United States. The company built 70 examples starting in 1979, but it is now out of production.

Design
The Beachcomber 25 is a recreational keelboat, built predominantly of fiberglass, with wood trim. It has an unstayed cat ketch or, optionally, a sloop rig, a plumb stem, raked transom, a transom-hung rudder controlled by a tiller and a retractable centerboard. It displaces  and carries  of ballast in its grounding shoe.

The cat ketch rig uses wishbone booms and unstayed, rotating, deck-mounted masts. The sails furl around the rotating masts and have sheets, outhauls and topping lifts. There are no mainsheet travelers or boom vangs fitted.

The boat two centerboard configurations. The centerboard is retracted with a 4:1 tackle.

The boat can be fitted with an inboard diesel engine or a small outboard motor for docking and maneuvering. The fuel tank holds .

Accommodation consists of a forward "V"-berth, plus a cabin quarter berth and "L"-shaped settee. The  galley is located on the port side forward, just behind the "V"-berth.  The head is a portable type and includes ventilation and a teak door for privacy.

The designer noted, "The main advantages of the cat ketch sail plan of the BEACHCOMBER 25 are its simplicity and ease of handling combined with good performance. The sails unfurl from the masts like window shades, controlled from the cockpit, with no need to go forward except to release mooring lines or haul up the anchor. Once the sails have been unfurled, you set up on the clew outhauls which also lead to the cockpit. A small winch is required in the case of the mainsail in order to obtain the desired degree of sail flatness. This is the last time you will have to touch the winch unless you reef or for the refinement of easing the outhaul for more sail draft off the wind."

Operational history
In a 2010 review Steve Henkel wrote of the design, "best features: The Beachcomber has a 1,400 pound grounding shoe and an extremely shallow, 15-inch draft, so she can be run up on a beach or mud flats—plus a high-efficiency centerboard for going to windward. The cabin is large and comfortable with a poptop for tall sailors. Worst features: Learning the knack of sailing this type of craft may take a while; quite different from a standard sloop. The long grounding shoe acts like a long keel; increasing directional stability but reducing the ability to tack quickly."

See also
List of sailing boat types

Similar sailboats
Bayfield 25
Bombardier 7.6
Cal 25
Cal 2-25
Capri 25
Catalina 25
Catalina 250
Dufour 1800
Hunter 25.5
Jouët 760
Kelt 7.6
MacGregor 25
Merit 25
Northern 25
O'Day 25
Sirius 26
Tanzer 25
US Yachts US 25

References

Keelboats
1970s sailboat type designs
Sailing yachts
Trailer sailers
Sailboat type designs by Walter Scott
Sailboat types built by Marine Innovators